The Nippon Sei Ko Kai, abbreviated as NSKK, sometimes referred to in English as the Anglican Episcopal Church in Japan, is the national Christian church representing the Province of Japan within the Anglican Communion.

As a member of the Anglican Communion the Nippon Sei Ko Kai shares many of the historic doctrinal and liturgical practices of the Church of England, but is a fully autonomous national church governed by its own synod and led by its own primate. The Nippon Sei Ko Kai, in common with other churches in the Anglican Communion, considers itself to be a part of the One, Holy, Catholic and Apostolic Church and to be both Catholic and Reformed.

With an estimated 80 million members worldwide, the Anglican Communion is the third largest Christian communion in the world, after the Roman Catholic Church and the Eastern Orthodox Churches. The Nippon Sei Ko Kai has approximately 32,000 members organised into eleven dioceses and found in local church congregations throughout Japan.

History

Background (1549–1846)

Jesuit Saint Francis Xavier together with Portuguese explorers and missionaries first brought Christianity to Japan in the 16th century. In 1587, the Christian faith and life were outlawed and Christians, Japanese and foreign, were openly persecuted.  In memory of these early Japanese Christians, and in common with the Roman Catholic Church, the Nippon Sei Ko Kai commemorates the Martyrs of Japan every February 5 for their life and witness.

All foreigners were subsequently expelled in 1640 as Japan began two centuries of self-imposed isolation and Christian communities were driven into hiding. When foreigners were eventually allowed back into the main islands of Japan in the 1850s, they found thousands of Christians who had maintained their Christian faith and identity through centuries of persecution.

Early mission church (1846–1900)
Anglican church mission work in Japan started with the British Loochoo Naval Mission on the outlying Ryukyu Islands in May 1846. George Jones, a United States Navy chaplain traveling with the Expedition of Commodore Perry, led the first recorded Anglican burial service on Japanese soil at Yokohama on 9 March 1854. More permanent mission priests of the Episcopal Church, John Liggins and Channing Moore Williams, arrived in the treaty port of Nagasaki in May and June 1859. After the opening of the port of Yokohama in June 1859, Anglicans in the foreign community gathered for worship services in the British consul's residence. A British consular chaplain, Michael Buckworth Bailey, arrived in August 1862 and after a successful fundraising campaign Christ Church, Yokohama, was dedicated on 18 October 1863.

Due to government restrictions on the teaching of Christianity and a significant language barrier, the religious duties of clergy were initially limited to serving as ministers to the American and British residents of the foreign settlements. The first recorded baptism by Williams of a Japanese convert, a Kumamoto samurai named Shōmura Sukeuemon, was not until 1866.

Liggins and Williams were followed to Nagasaki in January 1869 by George Ensor, a priest representing the Church Mission Society of the Church of England. Following 1874, he was joined by H. Burnside at Nagasaki, C. F. Warren at Osaka, Philip Fyson at Yokohama, J. Piper at Tokyo (Yedo), H. Evington at Niigata and W. Dening at Hokkaido. H. Maundrell joined the Japan mission in 1875 and served at Nagasaki. John Batchelor was a missionary priest to the Ainu people of Hokkaido from 1877 to 1941.

After the Meiji Restoration, significant new legislation relating to the freedom of religion was introduced, facilitating in September 1873, the arrival in Tokyo of Alexander Croft Shaw and William Ball Wright as the first missionary priests sent to Japan by the Society for Propagation of the Gospel. Williams, appointed Episcopal Bishop of China and Japan in 1866, moved first to reside in Osaka in 1869, then subsequently relocated to Tokyo in December 1873.

By 1879, through cooperative work between the various Anglican missions, the largest part of the Book of Common Prayer had been translated and published in Japanese. A full version of the text being completed by 1882. On Palm Sunday 1883, Nobori Kanai and Masakazu Tai, graduates of the Tokyo theological school were ordained by Bishop Williams as the first Japanese deacons in the church. In 1888, the Anglican Church of Canada also began missionary work in Japan, later mainly focusing on Nagoya and Central Japan.

In addition to the work of ordained church ministers, much of the positive public profile enjoyed by Anglican Church in Japan during this early mission period was due to the work of lay missionaries working to establish schools, universities and medical facilities. Significant among this group were missionary women such as Ellen G. Eddy at St. Agnes' School in Osaka, Alice Hoar at St. Hilda's School and Florence Pitman at St. Margaret's School, both located in Tokyo. Hannah Riddell who established the Kaishun Hospital for leprosy sufferers in Kumamoto and Mary Cornwall-Legh who ran a similar facility in Kusatsu, Gunma, were both honored by the Japanese Government for their work.

The first synod of the Nippon Sei Ko Kai met in Osaka in February 1887. At this meeting, instigated by Bishop Edward Bickersteth and presided over by Bishop Williams, it was agreed to unite the various Anglican missionary efforts in Japan into one autonomous national church; the Nippon Sei Ko Kai. The 17 European and American participants at the first Synod were outnumbered by 14 other clergy and 50 Japanese lay delegates.

Total Nippon Sei Ko Kai church membership in 1887 was estimated to be 1,300. John Toshimichi Imai, ordained deacon in 1888 and raised to the priesthood by Bishop Bickersteth in 1889, was the first Japanese to become an ordained Anglican priest.

In 1890, J. G. Waller, a Canadian Anglican priest, arrived in Japan with his wife Lydia. 1892, they moved to Nagano where he established churches in Nagano City in 1898, which was nationally registered as an important tangible cultural property in 2006. Waller helped establish a tuberculosis sanatorium in Obuse, Nagano funded by donations from Anglicans in Canada.

Continued growth and wartime challenges (1900–1945)

By 1906 the Nippon Sei Ko Kai was reported to have grown to 13,000 members, of whom 6,880 were communicants with a Japanese led ordained ministry of 42 priests and 22 deacons. Henry St. George Tucker, President of St. Paul's College and in 1913 appointed Bishop of Kyoto, was one of the foremost missionary leaders of the period who advocated that an independent, Japanese-led and self-supporting church was the only way in which Christianity could be carried to the wider population of Japan. Initiatives were put in place to help grow the financial self-sufficiency of church congregations and the first Japanese bishops, John Yasutaro Naide, Bishop of Osaka and Joseph Sakunoshin Motoda, Bishop of Tokyo, were consecrated in 1923.

During the 1930s, as overseas funding and the number of foreign Anglican missionaries in Japan declined, new challenges arose for Nippon Sei Ko Kai church leadership and laity from the increasing focus on Shinto as a state prescribed religion and the growing influence of militarism in domestic and foreign policy.  Christianity was portrayed by many nationalist politicians at the time as incompatible with the loyalty of Japanese subjects. In response the Nippon Sei Ko Kai issued periodic statements in support of the Imperial Army. And the first half of the 20th century saw NSKK's overseas expansion. Taiwan Sheng Kung Hui was established, several Japanese-language churches, such as Dalian Sheng Kung Hui Church, were built in Chung Hua Sheng Kung Hui's Northern China Diocese in Manchuria, and the Anglican Church of Korea was absorbed by the NSKK.

A more active period of government persecution began in 1937, particularly for Christian denominations such as the Salvation Army with its commitment to social reform, and for the NSKK with its historic links to the Church of England. Archbishop Lang's condemnation in October of Imperial Japanese Army actions in China, provoked hostile scrutiny of the NSKK and caused some in the church leadership to publicly disassociate themselves from links with the wider Anglican Communion.

During World War II, the majority of Protestant churches in Japan were forcibly brought together by the Japanese wartime government to form the United Church of Christ in Japan, or Kyodan. Reflecting the distinctive doctrinal character of the Anglican Communion, many individual Nippon Sei Ko Kai congregations refused to join. The cost of resistance to and non-cooperation with the government's religious policies was harassment by the military police and periods of imprisonment for church leaders such as Bishops Samuel Heaslett, Hinsuke Yashiro and Todomu Sugai, as well as Primate Paul Shinji Sasaki.

St. Andrew's Tokyo, now the Cathedral church for the Diocese of Tokyo, was one such congregation that resisted government pressure, struggling to retain its land, church buildings and Anglican identity to the war's end in 1945. However, like many urban Nippon Sei Ko Kai churches, medical and educational facilities, St. Andrew's buildings were lost in the 1945 Allied incendiary bombing.

Post WW II period (1945–)
The pressure of an extended war caused damage to both internal church unity and the physical infrastructure of the Nippon Sei Ko Kai; 71 out of a total of 246 churches had been destroyed, others were in bad repair due to neglect, requisition by the military or vandalism.

Through individual and larger communal acts of reconciliation, and with the support of an Anglican Commission sent out by the Archbishop of Canterbury, Archbishop Fisher in 1946; the Nippon Sei Ko Kai was organizationally reordered in 1947, with a leadership consisting of Japanese bishops at the head of each diocese, renewing its life and mission for the Christian Gospel in Japan.

Attending the 1948 Lambeth Conference, Presiding Bishop Yashiro took with him a finely embroidered silk cope and mitre, presented to Archbishop Fisher as a gesture of thanks from members of the Nippon Sei Ko Kai for the bonds of fellowship that continued to hold members of the Anglican Communion together, in the aftermath of wartime hostilities. The Archbishop of Canterbury, Geoffrey Fisher, wore the cope at the opening service of the Lambeth Conference that year and again in 1953 at the Coronation of Queen Elizabeth II.

The Nippon Sei Ko Kai became a financially self-supporting Province of the Anglican Communion in 1972.

Adopting a formal Statement of War Responsibility at the General Synod in 1996, and reflecting on the Japanese occupation of China and Korea prior to the Second World War, the NSKK has been active in multi-year projects promoting peace, reconciliation, and youth exchange programs between East Asian nations.

Two decades after becoming the first woman deacon, Margaret Ryoko Shibukawa was ordained the first woman priest in the Nippon Sei Ko Kai in December 1998.

The Nippon Sei Ko Kai celebrated the 150th anniversary of continuous Anglican Christian witness in Japan in 2009. The occasion was marked with a series of church and community events and visits by both the then Archbishop of Canterbury, Rowan Williams and the Presiding Bishop of the Episcopal Church in the United States of America at the time, Katharine Jefferts Schori.

In 2013 the NSKK co-hosted with the Anglican Church of Korea, the 2nd Worldwide Anglican Peace Conference in Okinawa.

The NSKK is a member of the National Christian Council in Japan.

Nathaniel Makoto Uematsu, Bishop of Hokkaido was the primate of the Anglican Church in Japan from 23 May 2006 until November 2020.

Present
Luke Ken-ichi Muto, Bishop of Kyushu, was installed as the current Primate of Nippon Sei Ko Kai on 5 November 2020.

Today the Nippon Sei Ko Kai continues its traditions of ministry and Christian witness in Japan through church congregational life, hospitals, schools, social advocacy, and support for non-profit organizations.

The church, at both a national and local level, works to support disadvantaged, marginalized, or discriminated against communities in Japan, as well as communities in Tohoku impacted by the 2011 Great East Japan earthquake, tsunami and subsequent crisis at the Fukushima Daiichi nuclear generating plant.

The NSKK also engages in field-based mission work overseas, such as in the Philippines.

Eight of the NSKK's dioceses ordain women to the diaconate and priesthood. The NSKK has ordained women to the priesthood since 1998. Women have been ordained to the diaconate since 1978, and the first woman to be ordained a deacon and, later, as a priest was Margaret Shibukawa Ryoko. In 2021, the Diocese of Hokkaido elected Grace Trazu Sasamori as bishop, making her the first woman to be elected bishop in the church.

Worship

The Book of Common Prayer used in worship is the Ki Tō Sho (日本聖公会祈祷書, 1959) that includes in its latest 2000 revision the Lord's Prayer wording, common between the Nippon Sei Ko Kai (NSKK) and the Catholic Church in Japan.

The Bible reading at the church is now mostly from the Japan Bible Society Interconfessional Version (2018), replacing the Japanese New Interconfessional Translation Bible (1987).

The Japanese Hymns Ancient and Modern has been replaced by Sei Ka Shū, the NSKK Hymnal (日本聖公会聖歌集, 2006).

Dioceses and notable churches
There are currently eleven dioceses in the Nippon Sei Ko Kai and over three hundred church and chapel congregations spread across the country. Notable churches in each diocese from north to south include:

Hokkaido
Christ Church Cathedral, Sapporo

Tohoku
Christ Church Cathedral, Sendai

Kitakanto
St. Matthias' Cathedral, Maebashi

Tokyo
The Diocese of Tokyo was established in its modern form in May 1923. There are 33 churches and 9 chapels in the Diocese, many having been first established in the second half of the nineteenth century. 
St. Andrew's Cathedral, Minato-ku, Tokyo
St. Alban's, Minato-ku, Tokyo, an English language based NSKK congregation located adjacent to St. Andrew's Cathedral.
St. Luke's Chapel, Chuo-ku, Tokyo located in the Old Building of St. Luke's International Hospital. One of the very few NSKK church buildings in central Tokyo to have survived the Second World War

Yokohama
St. Andrew's Cathedral, Yokohama
Christ Church, Yokohama landmark church located in Yamate overlooking the Port of Yokohama, hosting both English and Japanese language based congregations.
 St. Andrew's Church, Kiyosato, Yamanashi

Chubu
St. Matthew's Cathedral, Nagoya

Nagano Holy Saviour's Church, Nagano, built by J. G. Waller, nationally registered as an important tangible cultural property in 2006.
St. Mary's College, Nagoya, whose origin is the Child care workers' school established by Margaret Young (1855 - 1940), a missionary from Anglican Church of Canada.

Kyoto

St. Agnes' Cathedral, Kyoto

Osaka
Christ Church Cathedral, Kawaguchi, Osaka the cathedral seat of the Bishop of Osaka.

Kobe
St. Michael's Cathedral, Kobe

Kyushu
St. Paul's Cathedral, Fukuoka

Okinawa
Cathedral of St. Paul and St. Peter, Mihara, Naha, Okinawa

Related facilities

Nippon Sei Ko Kai affiliated educational, medical and social welfare institutions in Japan number over two hundred. Comprehensive lists of affiliated institutions are available on the official NSKK website.

Seminaries
 Central Theological College, Tokyo Founded in 1908 from the amalgamation of three older Japanese Anglican seminaries.
 Williams Theological Seminary, Kyoto

Religious orders
 Community of Nazareth, Tokyo. An Anglican religious order first established in 1936 under the guidance of the English Community of the Epiphany.

Universities and colleges
Rikkyo University, Tokyo (立教大学 Rikkyō Daigaku), also known as St. Paul's University
St. Margaret's Junior College, Tokyo (立教女学院短期大学 Rikkyō Jogakuin Tanki Daigaku)
St. Mary's College, Nagoya
Momoyama Gakuin University, Osaka (桃山学院大学 Momoyama Gakuin Daigaku), also known as Saint Andrew's University. 
Heian Jogakuin University, Kyoto and Osaka, also known as St. Agnes University
Poole Gakuin University, Osaka
Poole Gakuin Junior College, Osaka
Kobe International University, Kobe
Kobe Shoin Women's University, Kobe

Hospitals
St. Luke's International Hospital, Tokyo
St. Barnabas' Hospital, Osaka

Notable people

Early mission church (1859–1900)
Channing Moore Williams (1829-1910), Episcopal Bishop of China and Japan, founder of Rikkyo University
John Liggins (1829-1912), first missionary and ordained representative of the Anglican Communion in Japan 
Alexander Croft Shaw (1846-1902), missionary, founder of St. Andrew's Church in Tokyo and Archdeacon of North Japan 
Edward Bickersteth (1850-1897), First Bishop of South Tokyo
John Batchelor (1854-1944), missionary to the Ainu communities of Hokkaido
John McKim (1852-1936), Bishop of North Tokyo
William Awdry (1842-1910), Second Bishop of South Tokyo
Arthur Lloyd (1852-1911), missionary, academic and translator
Philip Fyson (1846-1928), Bishop of Hokkaido. Member of the Church Missionary Society
John Toshimichi Imai (1863-1919), First Japanese born Anglican priest, ordained in 1889

Continued growth and wartime challenges (1900–1945)
Paul Shinji Sasaki, (1885-1946) Bishop of Mid-Japan, later Bishop of Tokyo and Presiding Bishop of the Nippon Seikokai
Todomu Sugai, (1883-1947) Bishop of South Tokyo and Presiding Bishop January 1947 to August 1947
Henry St. George Tucker, (1874-1956) Bishop of Kyoto, later Presiding Bishop of the Episcopal Church
Joseph Sakunoshin Motoda, (1862-1928) Bishop of Tokyo
John Yasutaro Naide, (1866-1945) Bishop of Osaka
Peter Yonetaro Matsui, Bishop of Tokyo
Rudolf Teusler, (1876-1934) Medical lay missionary, founder of St. Luke's International Hospital, Tokyo
Mary Cornwall Legh, (1857-1941) Missionary to the leprosy communities of Kusatsu, Gunma.
Samuel Heaslett, (1875-1947) Fourth Bishop of South Tokyo
Walter Weston, (1860-1940) Missionary and Japan Alpine Mountaineer
Sidney Catlin Partridge, First Bishop of Kyoto
Hiromichi Kato, Bishop of Tohoku
Norman S. Binsted, First Bishop of Tohoku elected 1928
Arthur Lea, Bishop of Kyushu or South Japan
Philip Kemball Fyson, Bishop of Hokkaido
Charles S. Reifsnider, (1875-1958), Suffragan Bishop of North Kanto, President of Rikkyo University
Kenneth Abbott Viall, Assistant Bishop of Tokyo
Michael Hinsuke Yashiro, Bishop of Kobe, elected Presiding Bishop in 1947
Paul Rusch, (1897-1979) Lay missionary, educator, founder of Seisen Ryo (KEEP), Yamanashi Prefecture
Masayoshi Ōhira, (1910–1980) Prime Minister of Japan from 1978–1980

References

External links

Brief info from official Anglican Communion website
Japanese Anglican liturgical resources in English and Japanese
Anglicanism in Japan historical resources from Project Canterbury
More links to the Anglican churches in Japan (Anglicans Online)

 
Religious organizations based in Japan
Religious organizations established in 1887
Anglican Communion church bodies
Anglicanism in Japan
Members of the World Council of Churches
Christian denominations in Asia
1887 establishments in Japan